Straight to DVD is the first live album by American rock band All Time Low. It was released on May 25, 2010. The footage was recorded at Hammerstein Ballroom in New York. The band has released a sequel titled Straight to DVD II: Past, Present and Future Hearts in 2016.

Track listing

Standard Edition Includes
1 CD containing the full audio of the NYC show
1 DVD containing a blend of Documentary and Live NYC show, the Full Live Show Video, Outtakes
The names of the All Time Low fan club ("Hustler Club") members printed in the booklet (Members before March 2010)

Guest appearances
 Travis Clark
 Juliet Simms
 Andrew Goldstein
 Cassadee Pope

Personnel
All Time Low
 Jack Barakat - auxiliary guitar, backing vocals
 Alex Gaskarth - lead guitar, vocals
 Rian Dawson - drums
 Zack Merrick - bass, backing vocals
Additional musicians
 Brian Southall - rhythm guitar
 Matt Flyzik  - backing vocals
Live crew
 Matt Flyzik - tour management
 Matt Colussy - tour management (assistant)
 Evan Kirkendall - front of house engineer
 Jeff Maker - lighting designer
 Phil Gornell - monitor engineer
 Danny Kurily - guitar technician
 Alex Grieco - drum technician
DVD/CD Production
 Jeff Juliano - mixing

References

External links

Straight to DVD at YouTube (streamed copy where licensed)

All Time Low albums
2010 video albums
2010 live albums
Live video albums